Harold Poole (December 25, 1943 – August 7, 2014) was an  AAU, IFBB and WBBG  professional bodybuilder.

Biography

Born in Louisville, Kentucky Poole's athleticism was apparent very early on. He was quarterback on his football team at Shortridge High School in Indianapolis, placed fourth in the state high school wrestling championships, ran 440 yards in 50 seconds and put the 12 pound shot 55 feet.

In 1960, Poole entered the AAU Mr. America and, at the age of 16, took 18th place. His final AAU teen opportunity came in June 1963, where he won most muscular, but was the runner-up to Vern Weaver. Three months later, Poole switched to the IFBB and, at age 19, he won the Mr. Universe. In 1964, he became the first African-American to be named IFBB Mr. America. Starting in 1965, Poole became the only man to compete in the first three Mr. Olympia contests finishing runner-up to Larry Scott in the first two Olympias.

Harold was an active businessman operating a gym and discothèque.

He was also a bodyguard for fashion model Twiggy travelling across North & South America as well as the UK.

He retired from bodybuilding competition following the 1982 IFBB Night Of Champions, where he placed outside the top 10. He lived in Florida, where he continued to train with weights and practice martial arts until the end of 2010, when he moved to New York City. He was inducted to the IFBB Hall of Fame in 2004 and the WBBG Hall of Fame in 2007. In 2008, Poole was voted the Greatest Teenage Bodybuilder of All-Time.

Harold Poole died in New York City on August 7, 2014.

Competition and award history

1960

Mr America - AAU, 18th

Mr Mid-America - AAU, Most Muscular, 2nd

1961

Mr America - AAU, 4th

Junior Mr America - AAU, Overall Winner

1962

Mr America - AAU, Most Muscular, 1st

Mr America - AAU, 2nd

Mr North America - AAU, Winner

1963

Mr America - AAU, Most Muscular, 1st

Mr America - AAU, 2nd

Teen Mr America - AAU, 2nd

Universe - IFBB, Tall, 1st

Universe - IFBB, Overall Winner

1964

Mr America - IFBB, Tall, 1st

Mr America - IFBB, Overall Winner

1965

Mr. Olympia - IFBB, 2nd

1966

Mr. Olympia - IFBB, 2nd

1967

Pro Mr America - WBBG, Winner

Mr. Olympia - IFBB, 2nd

1968

Pro Mr America - WBBG, Winner

1971

Mr USA - IFBB, Tall, 1st

1972

Mr World - IFBB, Tall, 3rd

1980

Night of Champions - IFBB, 12th

1981

Grand Prix California - IFBB, 7th

Grand Prix New England - IFBB, 9th

Night of Champions - IFBB, 6th

Canada Pro Cup - IFBB, 8th

1982

World Pro Championships - IFBB, 9th

2004

IFBB Hall of Fame

2007

WBBG Hall of Fame

See also 
List of male professional bodybuilders
List of female professional bodybuilders

References

Roark, Joe. (November, 2004). "Featuring 2004 Hall of Fame inductee: Harold Poole". Flex
Comstock, Loren. (August, 1962). "Introducing Harold Poole". Strength & Health
Palmieri, Alan

External links 
 Harold Poole Official Website

1943 births
2014 deaths
People associated with physical culture
Professional bodybuilders